GKD may refer to:

  (Corporate Bodies Authority File)
 GKD sports cars, a British car manufacturer
 Glycerol kinase deficiency
 Gökçeada Airport, in Çanakkale Province, Turkey
 Klovićevi Dvori Gallery, in Zagreb, Croatia